The following pages are dedicated to important moments and events in the gaming industry, in their respective years.

Pre to the 1970s
 Games in ancient times – Royal Game of Ur, Senet, Tic-tac-toe, Rock paper scissors
 6th century in games – Chess
 15th century in games – Trick-taking game
 16th century in games – Bingo (UK game)
 17th century in games – Hangman, Jeu Royal de la Guerre
 18th century in games – Whist, Pinball
 19th century in games – Snakes and Ladders, Sudoku, Ouija; Nintendo is launched.
 1900s in games – Flinch
 1910s in games
 1920s in games – Escalado; Henry and Helal Hassenfeld found the Hassenfeld Brothers company (1923), later shortened to the name Hasbro (1968).
 1930s in games – Monopoly, Scrabble
 1940s in games – Cluedo
 1950s in games – Tactics, Risk, Yahtzee, The first ever video games are developed; (Tennis for Two, Nimrod and Bertie the Brain)
 1960s in games – Twister, Spacewar!, KerPlunk, Trouble, Operation, Battleship; Sega is launched

1970s
This decade saw the board wargame gain a level of popularity. It also saw the appearance of the earliest, simple video games, and the Dungeons & Dragons role-playing game.
 1970 in games – Buckaroo!
 1971 in games – Uno
 1972 in games – Pong
 1973 in games
 1974 in games – Connect Four, Dungeons & Dragons
 1975 in games – Pop-Up Pirate
 1976 in games – Breakout, Night Driver, Sprint 2, Blockade, Whac-A-Mole
 1977 in games – Combat, Air-Sea Battle, Canyon Bomber; Atari 2600 launched
 1978 in games – Space Invaders, Gee Bee, Frogs, Top Trumps, Hungry Hungry Hippos, Simon
 1979 in games – Asteroids, Lunar Lander, Galaxian, Head On, Monaco GP, Star Raiders, Football, Heiankyo Alien, Sheriff, Warrior, Tail Gunner, Radar Scope, Temple of Apshai, Akalabeth: World of Doom, Trivial Pursuit, Guess Who?

1980s
 1980 in games – Pac-Man, Missile Command, Battlezone, Rubik's Cube, Phoenix , Rally-X, Crazy Climber, Moon Cresta, Rip Off, Wizard of Wor, Mystery House, Space Panic, Stratovox, Zork, Adventure, Olympic Decathlon, Berzerk, Fishing Derby, Dodge 'Em, Boxing, Rogue, Warlords, Polaris; Intellivision is launched
 1981 in games – Donkey Kong, Galaga, Centipede, Frogger, Tempest, Castle Wolfenstein, Ultima, Wizardry, Qix, Scramble, Astrosmash, Utopia, Defender, Kaboom!, Lock 'n' Chase, Space Fury, Space Dungeon, Jump Bug, Bosconian, Mouse Trap, Space Dungeon, Turbo
 1982 in games – Pitfall!, Advanced Dungeons & Dragons: Cloudy Mountain, Ms. Pac-Man, River Raid, Yars' Revenge, Haunted House, Star Wars: The Empire Strikes Back, Atlantis, Jungle Hunt, Q*Bert, Demon Attack, Zaxxon, Robotron: 2084, Tron, Dig Dug, Microsurgeon, Moon Patrol, Xevious, Pole Position, Mr. Do!, Time Pilot, Joust, BurgerTime, Microsoft Flight Simulator 1.0, Buck Rogers: Planet of Zoom, Tac/Scan, Popeye, Megamania, Pengo, Millipede, Pooyan, Reactor, Front Line, Swordquest, Choplifter, Space Duel, Bump 'n' Jump, Tutankham, Star Trek, Gravitar, Smurf: Rescue in Gargamel's Castle, Cosmic Ark, Liberator; Colecovision is launched.
 1983 in games – Dragon's Lair, Mario Bros., Mappy, Punch-Out!!, Bomberman, Spy Hunter, Astron Belt, Jenga, Thunder Force, M.U.L.E., Jetpac, Lode Runner, Reader Rabbit, I, Robot, Food Fight, Major Havoc, Congo Bongo, Elevator Action, Track & Field, Libble Rabble, Gyruss, Tapper, Exerion, Ultima III: Exodus, Sinistar, Antarctic Adventure
 1984 in games – Tetris, Duck Hunt, Boulder Dash, Kung-Fu Fighter, H.E.R.O., Marble Madness, Sabre Wulf, Balloon Fight, 1942, King's Quest, Karate Champ, Dragon Buster, The Tower of Druaga, Cobra Command, Hydlide, Ice Climber, Pitfall II: Lost Caverns, Wanted: Monty Mole, Impossible Mission
 1985 in games – Super Mario, Gradius, Ghosts 'n Goblins, Kung-Fu Master, Hang-On, Space Harrier, Gauntlet, The Way of the Exploding Fist, A-Train, Phantasie, Where in the World Is Carmen Sandiego?, Paradroid, International Karate, TwinBee, City Connection, Word Munchers, Tiger-Heli, Time Gal, Commando, The Way of the Exploding Fist, Gridiron Fight, Paperboy, Metro-Cross, Baraduke, Indiana Jones and the Temple of Doom, Motos, Sky Kid, Tehkan World Cup, Rush'n Attack, The Oregon Trail, Mercenary, Road Runner; Nintendo Entertainment System launched in North America.
 1986 in games – Castlevania, Metroid, Adventure Island, The Legend of Zelda, Dragon Quest, Halley's Comet, Kid Icarus, Out Run, Fantasy Zone, Rampage, Bubble Bobble, Arkanoid, Ganbare Goemon, Alex Kidd in Miracle World, Pro Baseball: Family Stadium, Valis: The Fantasm Soldier, Star Soldier, Silpheed, Rolling Thunder, Scramble Formation, Starflight, Ikari Warriors, Trinity, Labyrinth: The Computer Game, Slap Fight, Mouse Trap, Kiki Kaikai, Rygar; Master System launched in North America.
 1987 in games – Mega Man, Contra, Street Fighter, Metal Gear, MIDI Maze, Final Fantasy, Wizball, Double Dragon, 3-D WorldRunner, Twin Cobra, Rainbow Islands: The Story of Bubble Bobble 2, R-Type, RoadBlasters, After Burner, Shinobi, California Games, The Last Ninja, Darius, Getsu Fūma Den, Operation Wolf; TurboGrafx-16 launched.
 1988 in games – Ghouls 'n Ghosts, Altered Beast, Assault, Splatterhouse, R.C. Pro-Am, John Madden Football, Ninja Gaiden, Konami Wai Wai World, Parodius: The Octopus Saves the Earth, Snatcher, Aleste, Truxton, Exile, Robocop, Winning Run, Chase H.Q., Forgotten Worlds, Syvalion, Metal Hawk, Wasteland, Cabal, Shufflepuck Café; Sega Genesis launched.
 1989 in games – Zero Wing, Prince of Persia, Super Monaco GP, Toki, Ys I & II, SimCity, Final Fight, Fire Shark, Golden Axe, Bonk's Adventure, Blockout, Strider, Hard Drivin', The Astyanax, Chip's Challenge, Hellfire, Twin Hawk, S.T.U.N. Runner, Mother, Minesweeper, Blue Lightning, DuckTales; Game Boy and Atari Lynx launched.

1990s
Major shake-ups occur in the who's-who of US game publishing and distribution. Wizards of the Coast, which started the decade as a small West Coast publisher, buys veteran Avalon Hill later in the decade, only to be bought up in turn by industry juggernaut Hasbro. TSR and Iron Crown Enterprises both collapse.

The collectible card game (CCG) became a dominant business model, first by Magic: The Gathering then by several rivals.  By the mid-nineties, hundreds of CCGs competed for market share, and most of these products were culled for weak sales.  Collectible gaming also expanded from cards into dice, tiles, and miniatures.

The Settlers of Catan breaks Eurogaming into the American market, becoming an overnight bestseller and gateway game.  Publishers such as Mayfair Games and Rio Grande Games begin meeting the new market demand with titles from Europe.
 1990 in games – F-Zero, Fire Emblem: Shadow Dragon and the Blade of Light, Race Drivin', Alpha Waves, Pilotwings, ActRaiser, MUSHA, Columns, Snake Rattle 'n' Roll, Snow Bros., Castle of Illusion Starring Mickey Mouse, Smash TV, Turrican, F1 Circus, Todd's Adventures in Slime World, Devil's Crush, USAAF Mustang; Super Nintendo Entertainment System and Game Gear launched in Japan
Online retailing begins to pose a challenge to "brick and mortar" game stores, though the full effects of e-commerce will not be felt until the following decade.
 1991 in games – Sonic the Hedgehog, Battletoads, Puyo Puyo, Street Fighter II, Duke Nukem, Micro Machines, Lemmings, Fatal Fury, Another World, Super Robot Wars, Road Rash, Alien Breed, Teenage Mutant Ninja Turtles: Turtles in Time, Cotton: Fantastic Night Dreams
 1992 in games – Wolfenstein 3D, Virtua Racing, Mortal Kombat, Super Mario Kart, Night Trap, Sonic the Hedgehog 2, Alone in the Dark, Kirby, Mario Paint, Flashback, Pinball Dreams, Fatal Fury 2, Ecco the Dolphin, Axelay, Recca, Gate of Thunder, Lethal Enforcers, Landstalker, Steel Empire, X, Lunar: The Silver Star, The Humans
 1993 in games – Doom, Star Fox, Ridge Racer, Virtua Fighter, Magic: The Gathering, FIFA, Gunstar Heroes, Batsugun, Lufia & the Fortress of Doom, The 7th Guest, Zombies Ate My Neighbors, Myst, Numan Athletics, Cyber Sled, The Incredible Machine, Rocket Knight Adventures, Secret of Mana, Elefun, The Settlers, Star Wars: Rebel Assault, NBA Jam, Rock n' Roll Racing, Cybermorph, Trevor McFur in the Crescent Galaxy
 1994 in games – Donkey Kong Country, Super Metroid, Tekken, Puzzle Bobble, Daytona USA, Darkstalkers: The Night Warriors, Warcraft: Orcs & Humans, The Need for Speed, EarthBound, Policenauts, The Elder Scrolls, Earthworm Jim, Cruis'n USA, Motor Toon Grand Prix, Virtua Cop, Alpine Racer, Point Blank, Theme Park, The King of Fighters, System Shock, King's Field, Killer Instinct, Gator Golf, Raptor: Call of the Shadows, Uniracers, Alien vs Predator, Club Drive, X-Men: Children of the Atom, Tempest 2000, Herectic, Clockwork Knight, X-COM: UFO Defense; PlayStation and Sega Saturn launched; The National Lottery launches in the UK.
 1995 in games – Yoshi's Island, Rayman, Worms, The Settlers of Catan, Battle Arena Toshinden, Panzer Dragoon, Wipeout, Bug!, Vectorman, Ristar, Alien Soldier, Comix Zone, Ginga Fukei Densetsu Sapphire, WWF WrestleMania: The Arcade Game, Air Combat, Mario's Picross, Tales of Phantasia, Panel de Pon, Trials of Mana, Pulstar, Zoop, Gex, DonPachi, Time Crisis, Destruction Derby, Hexen: Beyond Heretic, Front Mission, Discworld, Clock Tower, Command & Conquer, Atari Karts, Ruiner Pinball, Full Tilt! Pinball
 1996 in games – Pokémon, Quake, Crash Bandicoot, Tomb Raider, Tamagotchi, Duke Nukem 3D, Resident Evil, Bop It, Metal Slug, PaRappa the Rapper, Harvest Moon, Super Mario RPG, Nights into Dreams, The Neverhood, The House of the Dead, Dead or Alive, Guardian Heroes, Die Hard Trilogy, Pandemonium!, Tobal No. 1, Virtual On: Cyber Troopers, Sakura Wars, Fight for Life
 1997 in games – Gran Turismo, Castlevania: Symphony of the Night, GoldenEye 007, Touhou Project, Grand Theft Auto, Fallout, Diablo, Snake (first phone game), Klonoa: Door to Phantomile, Moon: Remix RPG Adventure, Croc: Legend of the Gobbos, Einhänder, Bushido Blade, Oddworld: Abe's Oddysee, Tomba!, MDK, Beatmania, Bulk Slash, Harmful Park, Panzer Bandit, Bloody Roar, Blast Corps, Turok: Dinosaur Hunter; Nintendo 64 launched
 1998 in games – Metal Gear Solid, The Legend of Zelda: Ocarina of Time, Soulcalibur, Dance Dance Revolution, Radiant Silvergun, Spyro the Dragon, StarCraft, Half-Life, Parasite Eve, Brave Fencer Musashi, Puzz Loop, Banjo-Kazooie, Ehrgeiz, Xenogears, LSD: Dream Emulator, Mizzurna Falls, Tenchu: Stealth Assassins, MediEvil, Colin McRae Rally and Dirt, Vigilante 8, Grim Fandango, Space Station Silicon Valley, Burning Rangers, Landmaker, Baldur's Gate, Forsaken, Heart of Darkness, 1080° Snowboarding, Thief: The Dark Project, Colin McRae Rally, Dynasty Warriors, Destrega, Glover, Skullmonkeys, Vigilante 8; Game Boy Color and Dreamcast launched
 1999 in games –  Super Smash Bros., Silent Hill, Yu-Gi-Oh! Trading Card Game, Tony Hawk's Pro Skater, Team Fortress, Ape Escape, Unreal Tournament, Medal of Honor, Crazy Taxi, Shenmue,  Driver, Vib-Ribbon, Racing Lagoon, Pepsiman, Mr. Driller, Legacy of Kain: Soul Reaver, Beetle Adventure Racing, Jet Force Gemini, Dino Crisis, Seaman, Bangai-O, RollerCoaster Tycoon, Syphon Filter

2000s
The internet continues to shake up the publishing and distribution of games.  Online retailing becomes a serious threat to "brick and mortar" retailers.  Desktop publishing proves to be a boon for hobby game designers, and the door is opened for many small publishers producing their own game designs. Z-Man Games and Fantasy Flight Games become major players in the US hobby game industry.  Miniatures games dominate the collectible games market.
 2000 in games – The Sims, Deus Ex, Hitman: Codename 47, Jet Set Radio, Counter-Strike, Perfect Dark, Icewind Dale, Shogun: Total War, Skies of Arcadia, The Operative: No One Lives Forever, Vagrant Story, TimeSplitters, Paper Mario, Phantasy Star Online; PlayStation 2 launched
 2001 in games – Grand Theft Auto III, Luigi's Mansion, Pro Evolution Soccer, Halo, Gothic, Taiko no Tatsujin, Animal Crossing, Max Payne, Devil May Cry, Jak and Daxter: The Precursor Legacy, Super Monkey Ball, Ico, Ikaruga, Rez, Bejeweled, Max Payne, Conker's Bad Fur Day, Zone of the Enders, Tom Clancy's Ghost Recon, Advance Wars, Pikmin, Burnout, IL-2 Sturmovik, Phoenix Wright: Ace Attorney, Oni, Onimusha: Warlords,  Serious Sam, Tropico, Fatal Frame, Golden Sun, Splashdown, Red Faction; Xbox, GameCube and Game Boy Advance launched
 2002 in games – Battlefield 1942, Ratchet & Clank, Grand Theft Auto: Vice City, Metroid Prime, Arx Fatalis, Dungeon Siege, Xenosaga Episode I, Kingdom Hearts, Eternal Darkness, Sly Cooper and the Thievius Raccoonus, Alien Hominid, Dark Chronicle, Mafia, Age of Mythology, Neverwinter Nights, Shantae, Agressive Inline, Marble Blast Gold, Tom Clancy's Splinter Cell, Ty the Tasmanian Tiger
 2003 in games – XIII, Call of Duty, Disgaea: Hour of Darkness, Alter Echo, Billy Hatcher and the Giant Egg, Beyond Good & Evil, Geometry Wars, Chaos Legion, Downhill Domination, Freedom Fighters, Mario & Luigi: Superstar Saga, Prince of Persia: The Sands of Time, Final Fantasy Crystal Chronicles, Drakengard, MapleStory, Freelancer, The Simpsons: Hit & Run, SSX 3, Manhunt, WarioWare, Inc.: Mega Microgames!, Siren, Rise of Nations, Viewtiful Joe, TrackMania, PlanetSide; Steam launched
 2004 in games – Cave Story, Fate/stay night, Fable, Far Cry, Monster Hunter, Def Jam: Fight for NY, Grand Theft Auto: San Andreas, Killzone, Half-Life 2, Sudeki, Painkiller, Psi-Ops: The Mindgate Conspiracy, Vampire: The Masquerade – Bloodlines, Sacred, Katamari Damacy, Breakdown, The Suffering, Lumines: Puzzle Fusion, Ballance; Nintendo DS and PlayStation Portable launched
 2005 in games – Guitar Hero, Nintendogs, God of War, F.E.A.R., Fahrenheit, Destroy All Humans!, Agatha Christie: And Then There Were None, Guild Wars, Trauma Center: Under the Knife, Chibi-Robo!, Devil Kings, Haunting Ground, Shadow of the Colossus, Psychonauts, Yakuza, Killer7, Sniper Elite, Club Penguin, Dungeon Fighter Online; Xbox 360 launched
 2006 in games – Wii Sports, Bully, Saints Row, Scarface: The World Is Yours, Rayman Raving Rabbids, Dead Rising, Viva Piñata, Gears of War, LocoRoco, Just Cause, Ōkami, Viva Piñata, Last Hope, Prey, Half-Life 2: Episode One, Garry's Mod, Rhythm Tengoku, Touch! Generations, God Hand; PlayStation 3 and Wii launched
 2007 in games – Assassin's Creed, BioShock, No More Heroes, Spectrobes, S.T.A.L.K.E.R.: Shadow of Chernobyl, Etrian Odyssey, Half-Life 2: Episode Two, Luminous Arc, Uncharted, Crysis, Mass Effect, Crossfire, Portal, Rock Band, Professor Layton and the Curious Village, Team Fortress 2, The Witcher, Patapon
 2008 in games – LittleBigPlanet, N+, Audiosurf, Moshi Monsters, Spore, World of Goo, Braid, Grand Theft Auto IV, Dead Space, Echochrome, Spelunky, Army of Two, Mirror's Edge, Valkyria Chronicles, Left 4 Dead, Castle Crashers, Army of Two, iRacing, Race Driver: Grid, BioShock, Flipnote Studio
 2009 in games – Angry Birds, League of Legends, Borderlands, Plants vs. Zombies, Hatsune Miku: Project DIVA, Bayonetta, Batman: Arkham, Words with Friends, Infamous, Just Dance, Left 4 Dead 2, Windosill, Scribblenauts

2010s
 2010 in games – Fruit Ninja, Kinect Sports, Talking Tom, Alan Wake, Limbo, Xenoblade Chronicles, Cut the Rope,  Red Dead Redemption, Danganronpa: Trigger Happy Havoc, Metro 2033, Super Meat Boy, Art of Balance, Blur; Kinect and PlayStation Move launched
 2011 in games – Minecraft, Terraria, Bastion, L.A. Noire, The Binding of Isaac, Payday: The Heist, The Elder Scrolls V: Skyrim, Portal 2, Homefront, Temple Run, Skylanders, Where's My Water?, Dark Souls, Rayman Origins, Rage, Pushmo; Nintendo 3DS and PlayStation Vita launched
 2012 in games – Puzzle & Dragons, Candy Crush Saga, Kid Icarus: Uprising, Subway Surfers, Fez, Dishonored, Clash of Clans, Draw Something, Forza Horizon, Gunlord; Wii U launched
 2013 in games – The Last of Us, Kahoot!, Monster Strike, Papers, Please, Grand Theft Auto V, The Stanley Parable, Antichamber, Proteus, Rogue Legacy, Yo-kai Watch, Injustice: Gods Among Us, The Wonderful 101, Disney Infinity; PlayStation 4 and Xbox One launched
 2014 in games – Crossy Road, 2048, Smash Hit, Shovel Knight, Five Nights at Freddy's, Watch Dogs, Destiny, Freedom Planet, Alien: Isolation, Assetto Corsa, Velocity 2X, Monument Valley, OlliOlli, Azure Striker Gunvolt, Hearthstone, Titanfall, Child of Light, Alien: Isolation, Astebreed, P.T.
 2015 in games – Splatoon, Bloodborne, BoxBoy!, Undertale, Implosion: Never Lose Hope, Ori and the Blind Forest, Axiom Verge, Cities: Skylines, Nuclear Throne, Rocket League, Life Is Strange, Crypt of the NecroDancer, Downwell, Dying Light, Mad Max
 2016 in games – Overwatch, Pokémon Go, No Man's Sky, Inside, Obduction, Watch Dogs 2, Stardew Valley, Hyper Light Drifter, Owlboy, The Last Guardian, Honkai Impact 3rd, Quantum Break, Abzû, The Witness, Tom Clancy's The Division; Oculus Rift and HTC Vive launched
 2017 in games – PlayerUnknown's Battlegrounds, The Legend of Zelda: Breath of the Wild, Fortnite, Nier: Automata, Cuphead, Nioh, Detention, Opus Magnum, Azur Lane, South Park: The Fractured But Whole, Snipperclips, Bendy and the Ink Machine, PUBG: Battlegrounds, Horizon Zero Dawn, Hollow Knight, Cruis'n Blast, Sonic Mania, Arms, Little Nightmares, Rime; Nintendo Switch launched
 2018 in games – Among Us, PUBG Mobile, Dead Cells, Tetris Effect, Astro Bot Rescue Mission, Red Dead Redemption 2, Super Smash Bros Ultimate, Deltarune, Dusk, Baldi's Basics in Education and Learning, Spider-Man, Iconoclasts, Celeste, Subnautica, Sea of Thieves, Yoku's Island Express, Into the Breach, Frostpunk, Gris, CrossCode
 2019 in games – Action Taimanin, Sekiro: Shadows Die Twice, Harry Potter: Wizards Unite, Death Stranding, Control, Untitled Goose Game, A Short Hike, Horace, Bloodstained: Ritual of the Night, Star Wars Jedi: Fallen Order; Stadia launched

2020s
 2020 in games – Fall Guys, Microsoft Flight Simulator, Genshin Impact, Gears Tactics, Watch Dogs: Legion, Ghost of Tsushima, Ori and the Will of the Wisps, Streets of Rage 4, Empire of Sin, Captain Tsubasa: Rise of New Champions, Ghostrunner, The Pathless, Hades, Wasteland 3, Twin Mirror, Bleeding Edge, Friday Night Funkin', Paprium; PlayStation 5 and Xbox Series X launched
 2021 in games – 12 Minutes, Back 4 Blood, Life Is Strange: True Colors, Super Monkey Ball Banana Mania, Cyber Shadow, Metroid Dread, Lemnis Gate, Deathloop, Poppy Playtime, Humankind, The Medium, Tom Clancy's Rainbow Six Quarantine
 2022 in games – Elden Ring, Neon White, Cult of the Lamb, Stray, Lunistice, Tunic, God of War Ragnarök

See also
 List of years in video games

Games
 
Games
Games